Aceralia was a large Spanish steel producer formed in 1997 by restructuring of a group formed from earlier mergers of the steel producers ENSIDESA and Altos Hornos de Vizcaya. The company merged into Arcelor in 2001, and became part of ArcelorMittal in 2006.

History

ENSIDESA
In 1950 the state owned company Empresa Nacional Siderúrgica Sociedad Anónima (ENSIDESA) was formed to increase Spain's steel production, part of the industrialisation and modernisation of Spain that led to the Spanish economic miracle of the 1960s. In 1973 the state owned company was forced to take over the Asturian steel company UNISA, which had invested heavily in a fully integrated steel works and did not have the capital to fund it.

In 1991 the state owned company ENSIDESA was merged with Altos Hornos de Vizcaya to form the Corporacion de la Siderurgia Integral from which the Corporación Siderúrgica Integral (CSI) was formed in 1994 from the more profitable parts (as part of a privatisation process).

In 1997 Aceralia Corporación Siderúrgica was formed by reorganisation of CSI, the same year the company formed a strategic alliance with the Luxembourg-based steel group Arbed. As soon as it was formed, it was also privatised. The group also acquired the Aristrain Group (steel sections), and Ucín (rebar, wire rod), in the process becoming the largest steel company in Spain. In 2001 the company merged with two other European steel producers, ARBED and Usinor, to form Arcelor.

See also

 List of steel producers

References

Sources

External links

ArcelorMittal
Steel companies of Spain